Henricus Eolenius (d. after 1661), was an alleged Finnish sorcerer.

Henricus Eolenious was a student at the university of Turku in Finland. At the university, the professor of Greek, Hebrew and theology, Martin Stodius, had been accused in 1644 of making a student crazy by teaching him sorcery; he was freed by the consistorium of the university, but fired, and in 1661, Eolenius was suspected of being his apprentice.

Eolenius had learned Arabic very quickly, which according to the vice chancellor of the university, Johannes Terserus, who was also the bishop of Turku, was a sign of a pact with the Devil. He was judged guilty of witchcraft and Devil's pact and sentenced to death, but the Swedish governor Per Brahe demanded that the sentence be appealed to a higher court, the Court of Appeal of Turku, which it was, and where Eolenius were acquitted. He was, however, forced to leave the university as not to embarrass the management. 

The theological university of Turku, which educated many priests, was a place for many discussions of the nature of witchcraft, and such accusations were common in the city in the 17th century, driven by the consistorium of the university, though they seldom led to execution; in 1665, the consistorium accused Elisabeth Nilsdotter, widow of a professor, of poisoning the wife of a member of the consistorium, the bishop Johannes Gezelius, with magic, but she was acquitted and received money for slander, and in 1670, another student, Isac Gunnerus, was accused of having been one of the apprentices of Stodius; he was freed but expelled by the consistorium.

See also
Marketta Punasuomalainen

References 

 Jan Guillou, Häxornas försvarare (The defender of the witches), Piratförlaget 2002  .
 Noituus - Kuolemantuomiot
 Ankarloo, Bengt & Henningsen, Gustav (red.), Skrifter. Bd 13, Häxornas Europa 1400-1700 : historiska och antropologiska studier, Nerenius & Santérus, Stockholm, 1987

17th-century deaths
Year of birth unknown
17th-century Finnish people
People acquitted of witchcraft
People convicted of witchcraft
Trials in Finland
17th-century executions
Witch trials in Finland